Danisa Phiri (born 1 July 1979) is a Zimbabwean former professional footballer who played as a defender and midfielder.

Career
Phiri played for five clubs during his playing career. He began with Njube Sundowns. In 2007, he joined Highlanders on loan. He then spent a short time with Dynamos in 2008 before returning to Njube, two years later he signed for Bantu Rovers in 2010 before going into coaching with Quelaton. He had a spell with Tsholotsho in 2015 after coming out of retirement alongside Joel Luphahla and Siza Khoza. Phiri won 1 cap for the Zimbabwe national team.

In 2012, Phiri, along with 5 other footballers, were given life bans from football due to their part in the Asiagate match fixing scandal with Zimbabwe that took place between 2007 and 2009. However, on 24 May 2015, Phiri was cleared of any wrongdoing in the Asiagate scandal. He proved to the ZIFA that he didn't take part in the matches involved.

Personal life
In 2020, Phiri teamed up with six other former footballers, including Ronald Sibanda, to hold a training camp to support young, local players in Bulawayo.

References

External links
 

Living people
Zimbabwean footballers
1979 births
Njube Sundowns F.C. players
Highlanders F.C. players
Dynamos F.C. players
Bantu Tshintsha Guluva Rovers F.C. players
Association football defenders
Association football midfielders
Zimbabwe international footballers
Zimbabwe Premier Soccer League players
Zimbabwe A' international footballers
2014 African Nations Championship players